Stevens Elementary School may refer to:

Schools with their own articles:
 Thaddeus Stevens School - Washington, DC - District of Columbia Public Schools
 Thaddeus Stevens Elementary School - Pittsburgh, Pennsylvania - Pittsburgh School District

Schools covered in school district articles or daughter list articles:
 Stevens Elementary School - Wheatridge, Colorado - Jeffco Public Schools
 Myrtle H. Stevens Elementary School - Rocky Hill, Connecticut - Rocky Hill School District
 Frances L. Stevens Elementary School - Ballston Lake, New York - Burnt Hills-Ballston Lake Central School District
 Lulu Stevens Elementary School - Houston, Texas - Houston Independent School District
 Mary Katherine Stephens Elementary School - Rowlett, Texas - Garland Independent School District
 Stevens Elementary School - Seattle, Washington - Seattle Public Schools
 Stevens Elementary School - Spokane, Washington - Spokane Public Schools